is a Japanese professional football player who plays as a right-back for Women's Super League club West Ham United and the Japan national team.

Born and raised in Kobe, Hyogo Prefecture, Shimizu played youth football for Tokyo Verdy Beleza and subsequently begun her professional career with the club in 2013. Shimizu moved to West Ham United in 2022.

Shimizu made her senior international debut for the Japan national team in 2018 and has since won 56 caps.

Early life and career 
Shimizu was born in Kobe, Hyogo Prefecture on June 15, 1996. She began playing football aged seven years old, influenced by her two years older sister. Her family moved to Yokohama, in Kanagawa Prefecture the following year, and she joined local club FC Susukino Ladies. By the time she was ten, Shimizu was a prolific striker for her team in national junior competitions.

In 2009, aged 12, she was accepted into Menina, the nation's top youth academy of the club she would later play for, Tokyo Verdy Beleza. She initially played as a forward but was gradually converted into a midfielder, and eventually settled on the fullback position which she would specialise. While at the academy, she befriended and rose through the ranks with fellow players such as Yui Hasegawa and Yuka Momiki, all of whom would go on play for the Japan national team together.

In addition to football, Shimizu was a talented runner from an early age and had competed in statewide marathon competitions at elementary level.

Club career

Tokyo Verdy Beleza 
Having progressed through the youth set-up of Tokyo Verdy Beleza, the club with the most number of titles in the top flight of women's football in Japan, Shimizu was promoted to the senior team at the age of seventeen. On 23 March 2013, she made her debut in the Nadeshiko League against FC Kibi IU Charme. She established herself as the first choice right-back in her first professional season, making 24 appearances in all competitions.

She scored her first goal for the club on 15 June 2014, in a match against the same opponents she made her debut with. In the 2015 Nadeshiko League season, Shimizu played in every single league game and was one of the key figures who led the team to win the championship that year, ending a five-year drought for the domestic title. In the years since, she has won multiple trophies with Beleza; including five successive domestic titles, five Empress's Cup, three Nadeshiko League Cup and the inaugural AFC Women's Club Championship. She had won the domestic triple crown with Beleza, having done so in consecutive year in the 2018 and 2019 season.

One of the most consistent performers in the league, Shimizu was first chosen to the Nadeshiko League Best XI in the 2017 season and has since been selected for five consecutive seasons, including the first inaugural WE League season after the league was revamped and turned fully professional.

In 2020, she was named captain of the club.

In August 2022, Shimizu left Tokyo Verdy Beleza after almost a decade with the club

West Ham United 
On 28 August 2022, Shimizu signed a two-year contract with English club West Ham United. She made her competitive debut for the club on 19 September 2022 in a 1-0 win over Everton.

International career
Shimizu was first called up to a training camp for the Japan U-14 national team in 2010. The next year, she participated in the 2011 AFC U-16 Women's Championship held in Nanjing, China. In 2012, she was selected to the Japan U-17 national team for 2012 FIFA U-17 Women's World Cup, where she scored in a group stage win against Mexico.

She received her first senior cap for the Japan national team on 22 October 2017, in a 2–0 win against Switzerland in the MS&AD Cup. At the 2018 Algarve Cup, she played in her first international tournament at senior level, coming on as a substitute against the Netherlands. Shimizu cemented her place as the starting right-back for the national team that same year, starting all the matches in Japan's victorious 2018 AFC Women's Asian Cup run where they defeated Australia 1–0 in the final to win their second consecutive title. This success was followed by a gold medal in the 2018 Asian Games, where Japan emerged champions of yet another closely contested final, with a 90th-minute goal at the death to win 1–0 over China.

She was selected to Japan's squad for the 2019 FIFA Women's World Cup in France and the 2020 Summer Olympics in her home country. She started all matches and played full games in both tournaments.

Shimizu was also part of Japan's squad that won the EAFF East Asian Football Championship in 2019 and 2022, and she was named Most Valuable Player of the tournament in the latter, as Japan went undefeated in the competition.

Style of play 

Despite her relatively slender frame for a women's footballer, Shimizu is known for her relentless and aggressive defensive capabilities. However, the qualities she has garnered the most praise for are her especially high work-rate and stamina, earning a reputation as a right-back who can make repeated overlapping runs over the course of a full match, contributing as much to attacking plays as she does to defending. This is largely thanks to her experience as a marathon runner in her youth.

Shimizu is also proficient at occupying attacking spaces on the pitch and creating goalscoring opportunities for her teammates. As with many Japanese players that are noted for their technical abilities on the ball, Shimizu often plays a key role in assisting goals from the high degree of accuracy on her early crosses and penetrative passes into the penalty box following dribbles down the byline.

Career statistics

Club

International 

Scores and results list Japan's goal tally first, score column indicates score after each Shimizu goal.

Honours 
Tokyo Verdy Beleza

 Nadeshiko League: 2015, 2016, 2017, 2018, 2019
 Nadeshiko League Cup: 2016, 2018, 2019
 Empress's Cup: 2014, 2017, 2018, 2019, 2020
 AFC Women's Club Championship: 2019
Japan U19
 AFC U-19 Women's Championship: 2015
Japan
 AFC Women's Asian Cup: 2018
 Asian Games: 2018
 EAFF Women's Football Championship: 2019, 2022
Individual
 Nadeshiko League Best Eleven: 2017, 2018, 2019, 2020
 WE League Best Eleven: 2021-22
 WE League Outstanding Players Award: 2021-22
 EAFF Women's Football Championship MVP: 2022

References

External links
 

Japan Football Association

1996 births
Living people
Kokushikan University alumni
Association football people from Hyōgo Prefecture
Japanese women's footballers
Japan women's international footballers
Nadeshiko League players
Nippon TV Tokyo Verdy Beleza players
West Ham United F.C. Women players
Women's Super League players
Women's association football defenders
Footballers at the 2018 Asian Games
Asian Games gold medalists for Japan
Asian Games medalists in football
Medalists at the 2018 Asian Games
2019 FIFA Women's World Cup players
Footballers at the 2020 Summer Olympics
Olympic footballers of Japan
Japanese expatriate sportspeople in England